is a sardonic term which refers to the reluctance to use words that are considered potentially offensive or politically incorrect in the Japanese language.

Now yōmuin is considered demeaning, so there is a shift to use  or  instead. This pattern of change is an example of the linguistic phenomenon known as the “euphemism treadmill”.

Other examples of words which have become unacceptable include the replacement of the word hyakushō for "farmer" with nōka. 

Since World War II, the word Shina for China written in kanji has been recognized as derogatory, and has been largely superseded by the Japanese pronunciation of the endonym, Chūgoku or with Shina written in katakana.

In the 1960s, the Sino-Japanese word  meaning "Mongol" was recognized for its connotation of a "stupid, ignorant, or immature" person (compare the English term “Mongoloid”), and the ethnic group is now referred to by the katakana term .

Kotobagari and ideology

Kotobagari has led to some confusing terminology.

NHK, the Japanese Broadcasting Company, runs a Korean language study program, but the language is referred to as "Hangul". This is a result of both the North and South Korean governments demanding that the language be called by their respective preferred name of Korea  suffixed with "language". North Korea wanted the show to be called Chōsen-go or "Chōsen language", taken from the Japanese pronunciation of the full name of North Korea, Chōsen Minshu Shugi Jinmin Kyōwakoku or "Democratic People's Republic of Korea". South Korea wanted Kankoku-go or "Kankoku language" from Daikan Minkoku or "Republic of Korea". 

As a compromise, "Hangul" was selected and Korean is referred to as "the language on this program" or "this language", but this has led to the use of the neologism "Hangul language" to refer to the Korean language; which is technically incorrect since hangul itself is a writing system, not a language.

Notes

References

Bibliography
 Gottlieb, Nanett (2006). Linguistic stereotyping and minority groups in Japan. Oxon: Routledge. .

Euphemisms
Censorship in Japan
Society of Japan
Japanese vocabulary
Japanese words and phrases
Political correctness
Self-censorship